Lords of Black is the debut album by Spanish power metal band Lords of Black, released on 9 May 2014 under their own independent record label.

Track listing

Personnel
 Ronnie Romero – Lead vocals
 Tony Hernando - Guitars, bass, additional keyboards, synths, narrated voices
 Andy C. (Andres Cobos) - Drums, piano

Production
 Tony Hernando - Production
 Anti Horrillo and Dani Ballesteros - Recording engineers
 Roland Grapow - Co-production, recording, mixing,  mastering
 Felipe Machado Franco - Cover art

References

External links
 Discogs.com
 Metallum Archvies

2014 debut albums
Lords of Black albums